Primary mediastinal B-cell lymphoma, abbreviated PMBL, is a rare type of lymphoma that forms in the mediastinum (the space in between the lungs) and predominantly affects young adults.

It is a subtype of diffuse large B-cell lymphoma; however, it generally has a significantly better prognosis.

Diagnosis 
Diagnosis requires a biopsy, so that the exact type of tissue can be determined by examination under a microscope.  PMBL is generally considered a sub-type of diffuse large B-cell lymphoma, although it is also closely related to nodular sclerosing Hodgkin lymphoma (NSHL).  Tumors that are even more closely related to NSHL than typical for PMBL are called gray zone lymphoma.

Treatment 
Treatment commonly begins with months of multi-drug chemotherapy regimen.  Either R-CHOP (rituximab, cyclophosphamide, doxorubicin, vincristine, prednisolone) or DA-EPOCH-R (dose-adjusted etoposide, prednisolone, vincristine, cyclophosphamide, doxorubicin, rituximab) has been typical. Other, more intense, regimens may be more effective.

Radiation therapy may be added, especially if chemotherapy does not seem sufficient on its own.  Radiation may cause other health problems later, such as breast cancer, and there is some debate about the best approach to it.

FDG-PET scanning is not as useful for predicting treatment success in PMBL as it is in other lymphomas.

Prognosis 
Most people with PMBL are successfully treated and survive for many years.  However, if the initial treatment is unsuccessful, or if it returns, the long-term prognosis is worse.  Relapses generally appear within 12 to 18 months after the completion of treatment.

Epidemiology 
This lymphoma is most commonly seen in women between the age of 20 and 40.

See also 
 Diffuse large B-cell lymphoma
 Primary mediastinal (thymic) large B cell lymphoma

References

External links 

Lymphoma